Daar kom die Alibama (in English: There comes the Alibama) is a popular traditional Afrikaans song and Cape jazz song. According to some sources, the song's history dates back to about 1863, and it originally referred to the warship, the CSS Alabama. The English name, Alabama, was respelt in the Cape Dutch vernacular to, Alibama.

Origin

CSS Alabama 
In the American Civil War, the CSS Alabama sailed under the Confederate States of America flag and raided U.S. commercial shipping, successfully gaining international infamy. During the CSS Alabama's South African Expeditionary Raid in 1863, the ship docked at Cape Town to take on supplies and sell cargo and ships looted during its mission. Alabama revisited Cape Town in 1864. The song may have originated during these visits.

River boat 
The South African journalist and author Lawrence G. Green states that the lyrics' reference to a "reed bed" possibly points to the song having a more humble origin. Green states that in the 1800s, there was a riverboat based on the Berg River, also named Alabama (Alibama), that once a year used to deliver reeds to the harbor of Cape Town. Weavers used the reeds to braid bridal beds for Cape Malay brides; at Cape Town harbor, they sang: "There comes the Alibama . . . the Alibama that comes across the sea ..."

Lyrics 
The lyrics in Afrikaans are:
Translated into English, the lyrics are:

References 

1860s songs
Jazz songs
Afrikaans-language songs
South African jazz